Nizhnerechensky is a rural locality (a khutor) in Verkhnerechenskoye Rural Settlement, Nekhayevsky District, Volgograd Oblast, Russia. The population was 80 as of 2010.

Geography 
Nizhnerechensky is located on the bank of the Tishanka River, 17 km northwest of Nekhayevskaya (the district's administrative centre) by road. Verkhnerechensky is the nearest rural locality.

References 

Rural localities in Nekhayevsky District